Johnny Get Your Hair Cut is a 1927 silent American comedy film directed by B. Reeves Eason and featuring Harry Carey. A print is preserved by Metro-Goldwyn-Mayer.

Cast
 Jackie Coogan as Johnny O'Day
 Harry Carey
 James Corrigan as Pop Slocum
 Maurice Costello as Baxter Ryan
 Bobby Doyle as Bobby Dolin
 Knute Erickson as Whip Evans
 Pat Hartigan as Jiggs Bradley
 Mattie Witting as Mother Slap

See also
 Harry Carey filmography

References

External links

Stills at silenthollywood.com
Stills at classicmoviekids.com

1927 films
1927 comedy films
Silent American comedy films
American silent feature films
American black-and-white films
Films directed by B. Reeves Eason
Films directed by Archie Mayo
Films with screenplays by Florence Ryerson
Metro-Goldwyn-Mayer films
Surviving American silent films
1920s American films
1920s English-language films